Dinka and Nuer are the two largest ethnic groups in South Sudan. Conflict over pastures and cattle raids has been happening between these two ethnic groups as they battle for grazing their animals. Nevertheless, in 2013, the former Vice president Riek Machar who is a Nuer, was dismissed by the president of South Sudan, Salva Kiir, who is a Dinka, which created conflict between the Dinka and Nuer people in South Sudan.

See also
Sudanese nomadic conflicts
Ethnic violence in South Sudan

References

Politics of South Sudan